Vagueness and Degrees of Truth is a 2008 book by Nicholas J. Smith, in which the author examines vagueness based on the idea of "degrees of truth". It means that although some sentences are true and some are false, others possess intermediate truth values.
In other words, some sentences are truer than the false sentences, but not as true as the true ones.

See also
Fuzzy logic
Half-truth

References

External links
Vagueness and Degrees of Truth

2008 non-fiction books
Oxford University Press books
Logic books